Penshurst is a historic village and civil parish located in a valley upon the northern slopes of the Kentish Weald, at the confluence of the River Medway and the River Eden, within the Sevenoaks district of Kent, England.

Penshurst and its neighbouring village, Fordcombe, recorded a combined population of some 1,628 at the 2011 Census.

The majority of the parish falls within the High Weald Area of Outstanding Natural Beauty, and the village is itself a conservation zone, with controls on the landscape ensuring the protection of its woodland and fields. There are several listed buildings in the village.

The village is the home of two historic estates. Penshurst Place, formerly owned by King Henry VIII, sits at the centre of the village in the valley, while Swaylands is situated at the top of Rogues Hill on the outskirts of the village.

History
The village grew up around Penshurst Place, the ancestral home of the Sidney family. There are many Tudor-looking buildings in the village, although some are Victorian. Henry Stafford the first Baron Stafford was born here in 1501.

The Leicester Arms, once part of the Penshurst Estate, was owned by Sir William Sidney, grandfather of poet and statesman Sir Philip Sidney. His other grandson, the Viscount De L’isle, was appointed Earl of Leicester in 1618 and it was shortly after this that The Leicester Arms, formerly known as The Porcupine, was renamed in his honour. The pub and hotel is now owned privately.

Penshurst Airfield was located close to the station, but within the parish of Leigh. It opened in 1916 as a military airfield, and served as a civil airfield from 1919-36. It was reopened as RAF Penshurst in 1940, and closed in 1946. To the south of the village, within the parish, are the settlements of Saint's Hill and Smart's Hill.

Penshurst Place

Penshurst Place is a 14th century manor house built in 1341.  The 2,500 acre estate, once the property of King Henry VIII, was left to his son King Edward VI and granted to Sir William Sidney in 1552.  The Sidney family have been in continuous occupation for more than 460 years since.  The house and its extensive gardens are now open to the public.  The historic banqueting hall at Penshurst Place has been used as a filming location for many Hollywood films, including The Secret Garden and The Other Boleyn Girl, as well as the BBC television series Merlin and Wolf Hall. The ancient historic parkland provides scenic walks to many visitors each year, contributing significantly to Penshurst's tourism industry. The two walking trails across the estate - the Parkland and the Riverside Walks, both take in part of the Eden Valley walk. With over 7 miles of the Rivers Medway and Eden flowing through the Estate, and several lakes, both game and coarse fishing are popular at Penshurst Place.

St John the Baptist Church

The parish church, dedicated to St John the Baptist, is one of the two churches in the civil parish.  The Grade I listed church houses many memorials and tombs, including those of a Viceroy of India, two Field Marshals and two winners of the Victoria Cross.

Notable residents

 The Sidney family of Penshurst Place, including
 Sir Philip Sidney (1554–1586), poet, courtier, scholar, and soldier of the Elizabethan era
 William Sidney, 1st Viscount De L'Isle  (1909–1991), Governor-General of Australia
 The Hardinge family, including
 Field Marshal Henry Hardinge, 1st Viscount Hardinge  (1785–1856), British Army officer and politician
 Charles Hardinge, 1st Baron Hardinge of Penshurst  (1858–1944), Viceroy of India
 Frances Hardinge (b 1973), author
 Arthur Henry Dallimore (b 1873), New Zealand Pentecostal minister and British-Israelite
 George Drummond of Drummonds Bank
 Sandy Gall, a former ITN newscaster

References

External links

 Penshurst Parish Council
 Historic images of Penshurst
 "Discover-the-Garden-of-England" - the section on Penshurst

 
Villages in Kent
Civil parishes in Kent